Kozai may refer to:

Kozai-Lidov mechanism, a dynamical phenomenon in celestial mechanics
3040 Kozai, an asteroid

Persons with the surname Kozai 
Yoshihide Kozai (1928–2018), Japanese astronomer
Kazuteru Kozai (born 1986), Japanese badminton player
Kaori Kozai (born 1963), Japanese singer
Takeshi Kozai (1974–2006), Japanese judoka

See also 
Kosai (disambiguation)
Kōzai Station